is a railway station on the Hōhi Main Line operated by JR Kyushu in Aso, Kumamoto, Japan.

Lines

Layout 
The station consists of a side platform serving a single track. There is no station building, only a shelter on the platform for passengers. A bike shed is provided near the station entrance.

Adjacent stations

History
JR Kyushu opened the station on 11 March 1989 as an additional station on the existing track of the Hōhi Main Line.

On 17 September 2017, Typhoon Talim (Typhoon 18) damaged the Hōhi Main Line at several locations. Services between Aso and Nakahanda, including Ikoi-no-Mura, were suspended and replaced by bus services. Rail service from Aso through Ikoi-no-Mura to Miemachi was restored by 22 September 2017 Normal rail services between Aso and Ōita were restored by 2 October 2017.

See also
List of railway stations in Japan

References

External links
Ikoi-no-Mura Station (JR Kyushu)

Railway stations in Kumamoto Prefecture
Railway stations in Japan opened in 1989